The Lioness is the second fantasy novel in The Age of Mortals series set in the Dragonlance Dungeons & Dragons world. It was written by Nancy Varian Berberick.

Plot introduction
The evil green dragon Beryl oppresses the kingdom of Qualinesti with the aid of her Dark Knights. A resistance leader, a mysterious Kagonesti woman who is known as 'The Lioness' arises to battle her.

Reception 
In a positive review, critic Don D'Ammassa wrote that it is a "nicely paced and generally satisfying adventure story".

References

2002 American novels
American fantasy novels
Dragonlance novels
Novels by Nancy Varian Berberick
The Age of Mortals series novels